Roman Maciejak (born October 23, 1988) is a Polish footballer who currently plays for Hammer Spvg. After scoring 14 Goals in the second league he joined Piast Gliwice. There he made 19 appearances in the Ekstraklasa for Piast Gliwice. Moreover he played in Germany for Waldhof Mannheim.

External links
 
 

1988 births
Living people
Polish footballers
Miedź Legnica players
Piast Gliwice players
Górnik Wałbrzych players
SV Waldhof Mannheim players
People from Jelenia Góra
Sportspeople from Lower Silesian Voivodeship
Association football forwards